The Swiss dispensing category (in German: Abgabekategorie) regulates which kinds of drugs can be dispensed by the pharmacist, and whether a prescription is necessary. Swissmedic, the Swiss authority for approving drugs, classifies the drugs under the appropriate category.

The categories themselves are defined by the Federal Office of Public Health, and are approved by the Federal Council.

Categories 

In justified cases, a pharmacist can dispense any drug without a prescription. This is the case, for example, when:
 The patient has previously taken the drug
 the patient knows the symptoms which need treatment
 the non-dispensation would cause a serious, adverse health outcome (e.g. HIV medication)

Criteria for scheduling 
Data from clinical testing, results of pharmacological research, decisions of other countries' pharmaceutical institutions as well as recommendations from the European Medicines Association are pooled to assess the classification of a drug. Swissmedic only approves the final product (e.g. a specific formulation with a specific dosage), not the substance itself. Thus, the same substance can be classified in different categories. Generally, drugs are scheduled depending on their potential for abuse and health damage.

Drugs containing new substances are usually scheduled under B for a limited time in order to assess the safety of the drug. Depending on the clinical experience, Swiss medic then reschedules the drug as A, B, D or E. Pharmaceutical companies can apply for a lower scheduling in order to sell their products without prescription. Swissmedic can also reschedule the drug in a higher category when it becomes aware of safety risks.

Hard criteria:
 Drug interaction: Drugs scheduled under E shall not interfere with any drugs classified under A+, A or B. Thus, class A+, A or B drugs must always be effective even when taken together with class E drugs.
 If the purchase has to be documented, scheduling under D or E is not possible.
 Narcotic drugs and their precursor substances are not allowed in D or E.
 Systemic drugs that are only used in children under 2 years are excluded from schedules D and E.
 Parenteral drugs (for injection, infusion or implantation, see route of administration) are scheduled as B if categories A+ or A are not warranted.

Soft criteria:
 Serious interactions with prescription drugs.
 Drugs that are not recommended for pregnant or breast-feeding women.
 Drug has a systemic effect.
 Medical indication:
 D: After counselling with a medically trained person (not necessarily doctor or pharmacist, but rather an employee of a pharmacy, for example), an average person must be able to know whether and when to take a class D drug.
 E: An average person must be able to know whether and when to use a class E drug without any help.
 The drug's effects shall not cover up a serious medical condition. Likewise, the use of a drug shall not impede or delay the diagnosis of a serious medical condition.

The scheduling criteria do not respect how often or how long a drug is taken. Therefore, there are prescription-free drugs which can cause substance withdrawal symptoms if improperly taken. Examples for this are codeine as cough syrup (class B, prescription exemption), many painkillers (class D, see medication overuse headache) and xylometazoline (D). On the other hand, most class B drugs are not known to have serious side-effects when taken once, at the usual age- and weight-specific dosage. An example for this are the corticosteroids, which are scheduled as B.

Health insurance 
Under the Swiss mandatory basic health insurance, only the costs for necessary drugs are reimbursed, with a 10% deductible. Because of this, doctors prescribe prescription-free drugs – as a proof of the drug's necessity. Without a prescription, drug purchases will not be reimbursed.

Notes

References (German) 
 Arzneimittelverordnung (PDF, 518 kB)
 Betäubungsmittelkontrollverordnung
 Betäubungsmittelverzeichnisverordnung
 Stoffliste der Swiss medic (XLS, 337 kB, Stand 28. Februar 2019)

Healthcare in Switzerland